Garnavillo Township is a township in Clayton County, Iowa, United States.  As of the 2000 census, its population was 1,008.

Geography
According to the USGS, it contains six cemeteries: Ceres, Garnavillo, Jenkins, McClelland, Saint Joseph and Saint Joseph.

The stream of West Branch South Cedar Creek runs through this township.

References
 USGS Geographic Names Information System (GNIS)

External links
 US-Counties.com
 City-Data.com

Townships in Clayton County, Iowa
Townships in Iowa